= Journal for Early Modern Cultural Studies =

- Discipline: Cultural studies
- Language: English
- Edited by: Dan Vitkus

Publication details
- History: 2001–present
- Publisher: University of Pennsylvania Press (United States)
- Frequency: Quarterly

Standard abbreviations
- ISO 4: J. Early Mod. Cult. Stud.

Indexing
- ISSN: 1531-0485 (print); 1553-3786 (web)
- LCCN: 00213932
- JSTOR: 15310485
- OCLC no.: 47346092

Links
- Journal homepage; Online access at Project MUSE

The Journal for Early Modern Cultural Studies is a quarterly peer-reviewed academic journal and the official publication of the Group for Early Modern Cultural Studies. It covers the cultural history of the period from the late fifteenth to the late nineteenth centuries. The journal was established in 2001 and has been published by the University of Pennsylvania Press since 2011. The journal was published biannually until 2012, when it became a quarterly publication. The editor-in-chief is Daniel Vitkus.

== Abstracting and indexing ==
The journal is abstracted and indexed in the MLA International Bibliography.
